The 2019–20 PWHPA season was the first season of the ongoing strike by the Professional Women's Hockey Players Association (PWHPA). The organization had been established after the collapse of the CWHL in May 2019, and organized a number of exhibition games and events throughout the season until the COVID-19 pandemic caused public events to be cancelled.

Business   
Budweiser was among the companies entering into partnerships with the PWHPA during the season, stating that "Budweiser is committed to sponsor the women's game." In November 2019, the company produced a two minute advertisement for the organization, set to the tune of The Hockey Song and featuring a number of PWHPA players and figures from the hockey community, calling for better support for women's hockey with the tagline "This game is for us all."

After having spent most of the season with the PWHPA, Jordan Juron became the first PWHPA player to rejoin the NWHL in January 2020 to sign with the Boston Pride.

Dream Gap Tour
Due to their boycott, the members of the PWHPA decided to compete against one another on a tour to various North American cities, creating a series of exhibitions called the Dream Gap Tour. Each showcase had players divided into teams with each team named after a particular player as captain. Prior to the launch of the Dream Gap Tour, the National Hockey League Players' Association (NHLPA) announced a partnership with the PWHPA in September 2019.

The first showcase was held in Toronto at Westwood Arena from September 21 to 22, 2019, and were sponsored by Unifor. Team captains were Rebecca Johnston, Brianne Jenner, Liz Knox, and Marie-Philip Poulin, and the four teams played a round-robin tournament. The second series of showcases took place in Hudson, New Hampshire, from October 5 to 6 and were sponsored by Dunkin' Donuts. All games were contested at Cyclones Arena. Team captains were Kali Flanagan, Hilary Knight, Jocelyne Lamoureux and Monique Lamoureux, and Lee Stecklein. The Hudson event series had two games on the first day and two on the second and adopted a playoff-style format. The second day's games have the losers from the previous day face each other in a consolation game and the winners play each other in a championship game. The third showcase was held in Chicago at the Chicago Blackhawks' practice rink, Fifth Third Arena, from October 18 to 20 and was sponsored by the Magellan Corporation. Team captains were former Olympic players Lori Dupuis and Jayna Hefford from Canada, and Hockey Hall of Fame players Cammi Granato and Angela Ruggiero, both part of the United States gold-medal winning team in 1998 Olympic team. The playoff-style format from the Hudson event was retained.

In January 2020, an expanded showcase sponsored by Secret was held in Greater Toronto again from January 11 to 12 in partnership with the Toronto Maple Leafs of the National Hockey League (NHL) sponsoring an outdoor skills competition. The showcase consisted of six teams captained by Kacey Bellamy, Kendall Coyne Schofield, Catherine Daoust, Amanda Kessel, Jocelyne Larocque, and Natalie Spooner. The next stop was in Voorhees, New Jersey, outside Philadelphia, from February 29 to March 1 with team captains Brianna Decker, Megan Keller, Sarah Nurse, and Blayre Turnbull.

For the Dream Gap Tour's final stop, the PWHPA partnered with the Arizona Coyotes of the National Hockey League with games held in Tempe, Arizona, at Oceanside Ice Arena from March 6 to 8. There were two PWHPA teams, each captained by Arizona natives Makenna Newkirk and Katie McGovern, that played each other twice. A PWHPA team then played a team composed of Coyotes' alumni.

The PWHPA was due to play a one-week tour in Tokyo in a three-game series against the Japanese national team. On February 24, 2020, the tour was cancelled due to the COVID-19 pandemic in Japan.

Schedule and results

2020 NHL All-Star Game   
Several PWHPA players were invited to participate in the 2020 NHL All-Star Game, featuring in the Elite Women's 3-on-3 Game held on the night of the Skills Competition.

2020 ECHL All-Star Classic 
Four PWHPA members were invited to participate in the 2020 ECHL All-Star Classic in Wichita, Kansas, in January 2020. The four players, all members of the American national team, were Annie Pankowski, Gigi Marvin, Dani Cameranesi, and Kali Flanagan. They participated in both the skills competitions and the 3-on-3 tournament.

During the skills competitions, Cameranesi and Flanagan demonstrated the fastest skater competition and were estimated to have finished with times between 12 and 14 seconds, despite the ECHL not officially recording their times. Marvin and Pankowski demonstrated the shot accuracy competition with times that would have placed both of them in the top three. No PWHPA players demonstrated the hardest shot competition.

During the 3-on-3 tournament, Marvin played for Team West, Panowski for Team Bolts, Flanagan for Team East, and Cameranesi for Team Hammers. Marvin notched the first point by any female player in an ECHL All-Star Classic with an assist on Taylor Richart's goal in the first game. In the third game of the tournament, Panowski became the first female player to score a goal, scoring 37 seconds into the first period. Flanagan scored the game-winning goal in the tournament's championship game.

Other events   
On September 22, 2019, sixteen members of the PWHPA played a team made up of San Jose Sharks alumni as part of the Sharks' Fan Fest. The next day, members of the PWHPA's New England hub faced off against the Boston College Eagles women's hockey team, losing 3–2 to the Eagles, with Megan Myers scoring both PWHPA goals.

On December 28, 2019, the PWHPA hosted a double-header event at the Place Bell in Laval, Quebec, with a match between the American Hockey League's Laval Rocket and Toronto Marlies and then one between the PWHPA's Montreal and Minnesota hub teams.

At the beginning of January 2020, a rally was held with youth players and former CWHL players in three Canadian cities, dubbed the Secret Equal Sweat, Equal Opportunity Skate Rally.

See also   
2019–20 NWHL season

References

External links 
 

2019–20 in Canadian ice hockey by league
2019–20 in American ice hockey by league
Women's ice hockey competitions in Canada
Women's ice hockey competitions in the United States
2019–20 in women's ice hockey
2019–20 in American women's ice hockey